Giuseppe Aquaro (born 21 May 1983) is a Swiss former football defender.

Career

Club career
Aquaro played in Italy for Foggia Calcio and A.S. Melfi, before signing with Swiss side AC Bellinzona in 2005. He signed a contract with leading Bulgarian club CSKA Sofia in the summer of 2010.

In February 2014, Aquaro was transferred to China League One side Shenzhen Ruby.

References

External links
 

1983 births
Living people
People from Baden, Switzerland
Association football defenders
Swiss men's footballers
Swiss expatriate footballers
Calcio Foggia 1920 players
A.S. Melfi players
AC Bellinzona players
FC Vaduz players
Italian expatriate sportspeople in Liechtenstein
Expatriate footballers in Liechtenstein
FC Aarau players
PFC CSKA Sofia players
Karlsruher SC players
Panetolikos F.C. players
Shenzhen F.C. players
S.S. Racing Club Roma players
U.S. Triestina Calcio 1918 players
FC Chiasso players
First Professional Football League (Bulgaria) players
2. Bundesliga players
China League One players
Regionalliga players
Serie C players
Serie D players
Swiss Super League players
Swiss Challenge League players
Football League (Greece) players
Expatriate footballers in Bulgaria
Expatriate footballers in Germany
Expatriate footballers in China
Expatriate footballers in Greece